The Agag gerbil (Gerbillus agag) is distributed mainly in southern Mauritania to northern Nigeria and Sudan.  IUCN lists the junior synonyms Gerbillus cosensi and G. dalloni as critically endangered.

References

Musser, G. G. and M. D. Carleton. 2005. Superfamily Muroidea. pp. 894–1531 in Mammal Species of the World a Taxonomic and Geographic Reference. D. E. Wilson and D. M. Reeder eds. Johns Hopkins University Press, Baltimore.
  Database entry includes a brief justification of why this species is listed as data deficient
 Schlitter, D. 2004.  Gerbillus cosensis.   2006 IUCN Red List of Threatened Species.   Downloaded on 19 July 2007.
  Database entry includes a brief justification of why this species is listed as data deficient

Gerbillus
Rodents of Africa
Mammals described in 1903
Taxa named by Oldfield Thomas